Compsus is a genus of broad-nosed weevils in the family Curculionidae, distributed across the Americas, primarily in northern South America.

Taxonomy 
The genus Compsus was first named by Carl Johan Schönherr in  1823: col. 1140. It belongs to the subfamily Entiminae, tribe Eustylini and to the so-called "Compsus genus complex".

A key to identify species was provided by Hustache in 1938 (in French), which was translated to English and adjusted by O'Brien and Peña.

Description 
Broad-nosed weevils of moderate size (approx. 7–12 mm), most of them uniformly covered by scales of variable coloration ranging from white to metallic green, pink, and blue. 

Many morphological features of Compsus overlap with those of related eustyline genera including Exorides, Eustylus, and Oxyderces, composing the so-called "Compsus genus complex".

Distribution 
Argentina, Bolivia, Brazil, Colombia, Ecuador, French Guiana, Guyana, Peru, Suriname, Venezuela; Costa Rica, Guatemala, Mexico, Nicaragua, Panama; Guadeloupe, Jamaica, NC, SE, SW USA.

Interaction with other species 
Two species in the genus (Compsus obliquatus and Compsus viridivittatus) are considered pests of Citrus in Colombia.

Compsus auricephalus, known as the golden-headed weevil is the species with northernmost distribution and has association with 46 plant species in 23 families.

Species 
The genus contains 101 described species.

References

External links 

 

Entiminae
Curculionidae genera